The Lotus E21 is a Formula One racing car designed and built by the Lotus F1 team for use in the 2013 championship. The chassis was designed by James Allison, Nick Chester, Martin Tolliday and Dirk de Beer with Renault supplying the team's engines. The car was driven by 2007 World Champion Kimi Räikkönen and Romain Grosjean, both of whom remained with the team after competing in 2012. The E21 was the first of the 2013 season cars to be launched.

Design
Despite the perpetual troubles the team experienced with the "passive Drag Reduction System" device on the E20 chassis, which spent most of the 2012 season in development without ever being raced, the E21 was launched with a passive DRS device of its own.

Following criticism of the cars raced in 2012 for being "ugly" because of a visible step in the design of the nose, the 2013 technical regulations allowed teams to use a "modesty panel", or a small piece of carbon fibre designed to cover the nose of the car for aesthetic purposes. However, the E21 was launched without a modesty panel, as the team felt that it offered no aerodynamic benefit, and that the aesthetic qualities it offered were not worth the added weight, however slight the weight gain might be.

Complete Formula One results
(key) (results in bold indicate pole position; results in italics indicate fastest lap)

 Driver failed to finish the race, but was classified as they had completed greater than 90% of the race distance.

References

External links

 Official website of the Lotus F1 Team

E21